The Knudsen paradox has been observed in experiments of channel flow with varying channel width or equivalently different pressures. This is a paradoxical behaviour because, based on the Navier–Stokes equations, one would expect the mass flux to decrease with increasing the Knudsen number. The minimum can be understood intuitively by considering the two extreme cases of very small and very large Knudsen number. For very small Kn the viscosity vanishes and a fully developed steady state channel flow shows infinite flux. On the other hand, the particles stop interacting for large Knudsen numbers. Because of the constant acceleration due to the external force, the steady state again will show infinite flux.

See also
Vlasov equation

Fokker–Planck equation
Navier–Stokes equations
Vlasov–Poisson equation
Lattice Boltzmann methods
List of paradoxes

References

Partial differential equations
Statistical mechanics
Transport phenomena
Fluid dynamics
Physical paradoxes